Dodona deodata or Broad-banded Punch, is a small but striking butterfly found in the Indomalayan realm that belongs to the family Riodinidae. It was first described by William Chapman Hewitson in 1876.

Subspecies
 D. d. deodata southern Yunnan 
 D. d. anu Corbet, 1937 Peninsular Malaya
 D. d. longicaudata de Nicéville, 1881 Assam to Myanmar
 D. d. lecerfi Fruhstorfer, [1914] Vietnam
 D. d. sakaii Hayashi, 1976 Palawan

References

Dodona (butterfly)
Butterflies described in 1876